Sile may refer to:

 Şile, a city and district of Istanbul Turkey
 Sille, an old former Greek village in Konya Province
 River Sile, a river in Italy
 Sile, an ancient Egyptian fortress
 Sile, a feminine name in Irish, usually anglicized as Sheila.
 Sile (typesetting system), a typesetting system based on TeX